The Statute of Westminster 1931 is an act of the Parliament of the United Kingdom that sets the basis for the relationship between the Commonwealth realms and the Crown.

Passed on 11 December 1931, the statute increased the sovereignty of the self-governing Dominions of the British Empire from the United Kingdom. It also bound them all to seek each other's approval for changes to monarchical titles and the common line of succession. The statute was effective either immediately or upon ratification. It thus became a statutory embodiment of the principles of equality and common allegiance to the Crown set out in the Balfour Declaration of 1926. As the statute removed nearly all of the British parliament's authority to legislate for the Dominions, it had the effect of making the Dominions largely sovereign nations in their own right. It was a crucial step in the development of the Dominions as separate states.

Its modified versions are now domestic law within Australia and Canada; it has been repealed in New Zealand and implicitly in former Dominions that are no longer Commonwealth realms.

Application
The Statute of Westminster gave effect to certain political resolutions passed by the Imperial Conferences of 1926 and 1930; in particular, the Balfour Declaration of 1926. The main effect was the removal of the ability of the British parliament to legislate for the Dominions, part of which also required the repeal of the Colonial Laws Validity Act 1865 in its application to the Dominions. King George V expressed his desire that the laws of royal succession be exempt from the statute's provisions, but it was determined that this would be contrary to the principles of equality set out in the Balfour Declaration. Both Canada and the Irish Free State pushed for the ability to amend the succession laws themselves and section 2(2) (allowing a Dominion to amend or repeal laws of paramount force, such as the succession laws, insofar as they are part of the law of that Dominion) was included in the Statute of Westminster at Canada's insistence. After the statute was passed, the British parliament could no longer make laws for the Dominions, other than with the request and consent of the government of that Dominion.

The statute provides in section 4:

It also provides in section 2(1):

The whole statute applied to the Dominion of Canada, the Irish Free State, and the Union of South Africa without the need for any acts of ratification; the governments of those countries gave their consent to the application of the law to their respective jurisdictions. Section 10 of the statute provided that sections 2 to 6 would apply in the other three Dominions—Australia, New Zealand, and Newfoundland – only after the respective parliament of that Dominion had legislated to adopt them.

Since 1931, over a dozen new Commonwealth realms have been created, all of which now hold the same powers as the United Kingdom, Canada, Australia, and New Zealand over matters of change to the monarchy, though the Statute of Westminster is not part of their laws. Ireland and South Africa are now republics and Newfoundland is now part of Canada as a province.

Australia

Australia adopted sections 2 to 6 of the Statute of Westminster with the Statute of Westminster Adoption Act 1942, in order to clarify the validity of certain Australian legislation relating to the Second World War; the adoption was backdated to 3 September 1939, the date that Britain and Australia joined the war.

Adopting section 2 of the statute clarified that the Parliament of Australia was able to legislate inconsistently with British legislation, adopting section 3 clarified that it could legislate with extraterritorial effect. Adopting section 4 clarified that Britain could legislate with effect on Australia as a whole only with Australia's request and consent.

Nonetheless, under section 9 of the statute, on matters not within Commonwealth power Britain could still legislate with effect in all or any of the Australian states, without the agreement of the Commonwealth although only to the extent of "the constitutional practice existing before the commencement" of the statute. However, this capacity had never been used. In particular, it was not used to implement the result of the 1933 Western Australian secession referendum, as it did not have the support of the Australian government.
 
All British power to legislate with effect in Australia ended with the Australia Act 1986, the British version of which says that it was passed with the request and consent of the Australian Parliament, which had obtained the concurrence of the parliaments of the Australian states.

Canada
This statute limited the legislative authority of the British parliament over Canada, effectively giving the country legal autonomy as a self-governing Dominion, though the British parliament retained the power to amend Canada's constitution at the request of Canada. That authority remained in effect until the Constitution Act, 1982, which transferred it to Canada, the final step to achieving full sovereignty.
 
The British North America Acts—the written elements (in 1931) of the Canadian constitution—were excluded from the application of the statute because of disagreements between the Canadian provinces and the federal government over how the British North America Acts could be otherwise amended. These disagreements were resolved only in time for the passage of the Canada Act 1982, thus completing the patriation of the Canadian constitution to Canada. At that time, the Canadian parliament also repealed sections 4 and 7(1) of the Statute of Westminster. The Statute of Westminster remains a part of the constitution of Canada by virtue of section 52(2)(b) of the Constitution Act, 1982.

As a consequence of the statute's adoption, the Parliament of Canada gained the ability to abolish appeals to the Judicial Committee of the Privy Council. Criminal appeals were abolished in 1933, while civil appeals continued until 1949. The passage of the Statute of Westminster meant that changes in British legislation governing the succession to the throne no longer automatically applied to Canada.

Irish Free State
The Irish Free State never formally adopted the Statute of Westminster, its Executive Council (cabinet) taking the view that the Anglo-Irish Treaty of 1921 had already ended Westminster's right to legislate for the Irish Free State. The Free State's constitution gave the Oireachtas "sole and exclusive power of making laws". Hence, even before 1931, the Irish Free State did not arrest British Army and Royal Air Force deserters on its territory, even though the UK believed post-1922 British laws gave the Free State's Garda Síochána the power to do so. The UK's Irish Free State Constitution Act 1922 said, however, " in the [Free State] Constitution shall be construed as prejudicing the power of [the British] Parliament to make laws affecting the Irish Free State in any case where, in accordance with constitutional practice, Parliament would make laws affecting other self-governing Dominions".
  
Motions of approval of the Report of the Commonwealth Conference had been passed by the Dáil and Seanad in May 1931 and the final form of the Statute of Westminster included the Irish Free State among the Dominions the British Parliament could not legislate for without the Dominion's request and consent. Originally, the UK government had wanted to exclude from the Statute of Westminster the legislation underpinning the 1921 treaty, from which the Free State's constitution had emerged. Executive Council President (Prime Minister) W. T. Cosgrave objected, although he promised that the Executive Council would not amend the legislation unilaterally. The other Dominions backed Cosgrave and, when an amendment to similar effect was proposed at Westminster by John Gretton, parliament duly voted it down. When the statute became law in the UK, Patrick McGilligan, the Free State Minister for External Affairs, stated: "It is a solemn declaration by the British people through their representatives in Parliament that the powers inherent in the Treaty position are what we have proclaimed them to be for the last ten years." He went on to present the statute as largely the fruit of the Free State's efforts to secure for the other Dominions the same benefits it already enjoyed under the treaty. The Statute of Westminster had the effect of granting the Irish Free State internationally recognised independence.

Éamon de Valera led Fianna Fáil to victory in the Free State election of 1932 on a platform of republicanising the Free State from within. Upon taking office, De Valera began removing the monarchical elements of the Constitution, beginning with the Oath of Allegiance. De Valera initially considered invoking the Statute of Westminster in making these changes, but John J. Hearne advised him not to. Abolishing the Oath of Allegiance in effect abrogated the 1921 treaty. Generally, the British thought that this was morally objectionable but legally permitted by the Statute of Westminster. Robert Lyon Moore, a Southern Unionist from County Donegal, challenged the legality of the abolition in the Irish Free State's courts and then appealed to the Judicial Committee of the Privy Council (JCPC) in London. However, the Free State had also abolished the right of appeal to the JCPC. In 1935, the JCPC ruled that both abolitions were valid under the Statute of Westminster. The Free State, which in 1937 was renamed Ireland, left the Commonwealth in 1949 upon the coming into force of its Republic of Ireland Act.

New Zealand
The Parliament of New Zealand adopted the Statute of Westminster by passing its Statute of Westminster Adoption Act 1947 in November 1947. The New Zealand Constitution Amendment Act, passed the same year, empowered the New Zealand Parliament to change the constitution, but did not remove the ability of the British Parliament to legislate regarding the New Zealand constitution. The remaining role of the British Parliament was removed by the New Zealand Constitution Act 1986 and the Statute of Westminster was repealed in its entirety.

Newfoundland
The Dominion of Newfoundland never adopted the Statute of Westminster, especially because of financial troubles and corruption there. By request of the Dominion's government, the United Kingdom established the Commission of Government in 1934, resuming direct rule of Newfoundland. That arrangement remained until Newfoundland became a province of Canada in 1949 following referendums on the issue in 1948.

Union of South Africa
Although the Union of South Africa was not among the Dominions that needed to adopt the Statute of Westminster for it to take effect, two laws—the Status of the Union Act, 1934, and the Royal Executive Functions and Seals Act of 1934—were passed to confirm South Africa's status as a fully sovereign state.

Implications for succession to the throne

The preamble to the Statute of Westminster sets out a guideline for changing the rules of succession to the Crown. The second paragraph of the preamble to the statute reads:

Though a preamble is not considered to have the force of statute law, that of the Statute of Westminster has come to be a constitutional convention, which “has always been treated in practice as though it were a binding requirement." The convention was then adopted by every country that subsequently gained its independence from Britain and became a Commonwealth realm. It is, thus, fundamental to the relationship between the Commonwealth realms. As sovereign nations, however, each is free to withdraw from the arrangement, using their respective processes for constitutional amendment.

This means, for example, that any change in any realm to the Act of Settlement's provisions barring Roman Catholics from the throne would require the unanimous assent of the parliaments of all the other Commonwealth realms, if the shared aspect of the Crown is to be retained. Additionally, per section 4, if a realm wished for a British act amending the Act of Settlement in the UK to become part of that realm's laws, thereby amending the Act of Settlement in that realm, it would have to request and consent to the British act and the British act would have to state that such request and consent had been given. Section 4 of the Statute of Westminster has been repealed in a number of realms and replaced by other constitutional clauses absolutely disallowing the British Parliament from legislating for those realms.

This has raised some logistical concerns, as it would mean multiple parliaments would all have to assent to any future changes in any realm to its line of succession, as with the Perth Agreement's proposals to abolish male-preference primogeniture.

Abdication of King Edward VIII

During the abdication crisis in 1936, British Prime Minister Stanley Baldwin consulted the Commonwealth prime ministers at the request of King Edward VIII. The King wanted to marry Wallis Simpson, whom Baldwin and other British politicians considered unacceptable as Queen, as she was an American divorcée. Baldwin was able to get the then-five Dominion prime ministers to agree with this and, thus, register their official disapproval at the King's planned marriage. The King later requested the Commonwealth prime ministers be consulted on a compromise plan, in which he would wed Simpson under a morganatic marriage, pursuant to which she would not become queen. Under Baldwin's pressure, this plan was also rejected by the Dominions. All of these negotiations occurred at a diplomatic level and never went to the Commonwealth parliaments. However, the enabling legislation that allowed for the actual abdication (His Majesty's Declaration of Abdication Act 1936) did require the assent of each Dominion parliament to be passed and the request and consent of the Dominion governments so as to allow it to be part of the law of each Dominion. For expediency and to avoid embarrassment, the British government had suggested the Dominion governments regard whoever is monarch of the UK to automatically be their monarch. However, the Dominions rejected this; Prime Minister of Canada William Lyon Mackenzie King pointed out that the Statute of Westminster required Canada's request and consent to any legislation passed by the British Parliament before it could become part of Canada's laws and affect the line of succession in Canada. The text of the British act states that Canada requested and consented (the only Dominion to formally do both) to the act applying in Canada under the Statute of Westminster, while Australia, New Zealand, and the Union of South Africa simply assented.

In February 1937, the South African Parliament formally gave its assent by passing His Majesty King Edward the Eighth's Abdication Act, 1937, which declared that Edward VIII had abdicated on 10 December 1936; that he and his descendants, if any, would have no right of succession to the throne; and that the Royal Marriages Act 1772 would not apply to him or his descendants, if any. The move was largely done for symbolic purposes, in an attempt by Prime Minister J. B. M. Hertzog to assert South Africa's independence from Britain. In Canada, the federal Parliament passed the Succession to the Throne Act, 1937, to assent to His Majesty's Declaration of Abdication Act and ratify the government's request and consent to it.

In the Irish Free State, Prime Minister Éamon de Valera used the departure of Edward VIII as an opportunity to remove all explicit mention of the monarch from the Constitution of the Irish Free State, through the Constitution (Amendment No. 27) Act 1936, passed on 11 December 1936. The following day, the External Relations Act provided for the king to carry out certain diplomatic functions, if authorised by law; the same act also brought Edward VIII's Instrument of Abdication into effect for the purposes of Irish law (s. 3(2)). A new Constitution of Ireland, with a president, was approved by Irish voters in 1937, with the Irish Free State becoming simply "Ireland", or, in the Irish language, "". However, the head of state of Ireland remained unclear until 1949, when Ireland unambiguously became a republic outside the Commonwealth of Nations by enacting The Republic of Ireland Act 1948.

Commemoration
In some countries where the Statute of Westminster forms a part of the constitution, the anniversary of the date of the passage of the original British statute is commemorated as Statute of Westminster Day. In Canada, it is mandated that, on 11 December, the Royal Union Flag (as the Union Jack is called by law in Canada) is to be flown at properties owned by the federal Crown, where the requisite second flag pole is available.

See also
 Chanak Crisis
 Commonwealth of Nations membership criteria
 Westminster system
 Canadian sovereignty

Notes

References

Further reading
 Bailey, Kenneth H. "The Statute of Westminster." Australian Quarterly 3.12 (1931): 24–46. online
 Mansergh, Nicholas. Survey of British Commonwealth affairs: problems of external policy, 1931–1939 (Oxford University Press, 1952).
 Nicolson, Harold. King George V (1953) pp 470–488. online
 Plucknett, Theodore FT. "Case and the Statute of Westminster II." Columbia Law Review (1931): 778–799. online
 Wheare, K. C. The Statute of Westminster, 1931 (Clarendon Press, 1933).
 Wheare, K. C. The Statute of Westminster and dominion status (Oxford University Press, 1953).

External links
Digital reproduction of the Original Act on the Parliamentary Archives catalogue

1 – Canada and the Statute of Westminster
2 – Canada and the Statute of Westminster
Statute of Westminster, 1931 (text)
Australia and the Statute of Westminster

Commonwealth realms
1931 in law
United Kingdom Acts of Parliament 1931
Australian constitutional law
History of the Commonwealth of Nations
Political charters
1931 in international relations
Sovereignty
British constitutional laws concerning Ireland
Australia–United Kingdom relations
Canada–United Kingdom relations
Ireland–United Kingdom relations
New Zealand–United Kingdom relations
South Africa–United Kingdom relations
December 1931 events
Australia and the Commonwealth of Nations
Canada and the Commonwealth of Nations
Ireland and the Commonwealth of Nations
New Zealand and the Commonwealth of Nations
South Africa and the Commonwealth of Nations
United Kingdom and the Commonwealth of Nations